Ordoño III (–956) was the King of León from 951 to 956, son and successor of Ramiro II (931–951). He confronted Navarre and Castile, who supported his half-brother Sancho the Fat in disputing Ordoño's claim to the throne.

He also had to deal with internal rebellion, attacks from the Muslims of al-Andalus, and the rebellion of Galicia. In response to the Muslims, Ordoño III led a raid as far as Lisbon (955), coming back north with a very lucrative haul of loot. Faced with this great show of force, Abd-al-Rahman III (912–961) was pushed to negotiate and conclude a peace treaty with the king of León.

He tried to continue the actions of his father in fortifying the land and the royal authority in the face of the contumacious and secessional Fernán González of Castile. He even married Fernán's daughter Urraca and later repudiated her over her father's alliance with Sancho.

Urraca bore him at least two children: a son named Ordoño who died young and a daughter named Theresa who became a nun. Ordoño III was also father of Bermudo II, but opinion is divided as to whether he was son of Urraca, or of a mistress, one of the daughters of Count Pelayo Gonzalez.

Ordoño III died at Zamora in 956.

Notes

920s births
956 deaths
Year of birth uncertain
10th-century Leonese monarchs
Beni Alfons
Burials in the Royal Pantheon at the Basilica of San Isidoro